Gregory's wolf (Canis rufus gregoryi), also known as the Mississippi Valley wolf, was a subspecies of the red wolf. It was declared extinct in 1980. It once roamed the regions in and around the lower Mississippi River basin.

Taxonomy
This wolf was recognized as a subspecies of Canis lupus in the taxonomic authority Mammal Species of the World (2005). This canid is proposed by some authors as a subspecies of the red wolf (Canis rufus or Canis lupus rufus) .

Description
The subspecies was described as being larger than the red wolf, but more slender and tawny. Its coloring includes a combination of black, grey, and white, along with a large amount of cinnamon coloring along the back of its body and the top of its head.

References

Subspecies of Canis lupus
Extinct animals of the United States
Wolves in the United States
Mammals described in 1937